The 1980–81 season was Liverpool Football Club's 89th season in existence and their 19th consecutive season in the First Division. It was a season of contrasts for Liverpool as they won the European Cup for the third time by defeating Real Madrid 1–0 in Paris, and winning the Football League Cup for the first time by defeating that season's Second Division champions West Ham United after a replay at Villa Park. They also beat West Ham in the Charity Shield.

The Football League season, however, turned out to be a big disappointment after successive titles in previous seasons, by only finishing fifth, and then losing to Everton in the Fourth Round of the FA Cup. It was to be the last season for a few players, and with Bob Paisley looking to the future bringing in players who would go on to feature regularly for the club for the rest of the decade and even the 1990s.

Squad

Goalkeepers
  Ray Clemence
  Steve Ogrizovic
  Bruce Grobbelaar

Defenders
  Avi Cohen
  Colin Irwin
  Phil Neal
  Alan Hansen
  Phil Thompson
  Alan Kennedy
  Richard Money

Midfielders
  Jimmy Case
  Steve Heighway
  Sammy Lee
  Ray Kennedy
  Terry McDermott
  Kevin Sheedy
  Graeme Souness
  Ronnie Whelan

Forwards
 
  Kenny Dalglish
  Howard Gayle
  David Johnson
  Ian Rush
  Colin Russell

League table

Results

First Division

FA Charity Shield

FA Cup

League Cup

League Cup final

League Cup final replay

European Cup

European Cup final

References

LFC History.net – Games for the 1980–81 season
Liverweb - Games for the 1980–81 season

Liverpool F.C. seasons
Liverpool
UEFA Champions League-winning seasons